Best of + is the second greatest hits compilation album by the Greek singer Peggy Zina, released in Greece and Cyprus on June 24, 2008, by Minos EMI on CD and in a CD and DVD package which includes her music videos. The album includes three new tracks composed and written by Giorgos Moukidis on the first disc, all three of which were released as singles.

Track listing

Disc 1

Disc 2

Singles
"Paradosou"
"Paradosou" was released as a radio single several weeks before the release of the album and included a music video.
"To Kalokairi"
"To Kalokairi" is the second single released from the album in the format of a radio single and music video. It was released in October 2008.
"Geia Sou"
"Geia Sou", the last new song from the album, was released as the third single on December 16, 2008.

Charts
The album peaked at number three on the Greek Albums Chart, and has since charted for a total of 16 weeks as of the week 9/2009 charts. By November, it had certified gold and the award was presented to Zina at a certification party at the Vox nightclub on December 3, 2008. At the party she sang many of her successful songs and spent time with her close friends and those in the music industry who had helped her.

References

Peggy Zina compilation albums
Greek-language albums
2008 greatest hits albums
2008 video albums
Music video compilation albums